The Ivorian Coast national basketball team is the men's basketball side that represents Ivory Coast in international competition. The team competes regularly in the African Championship and is administered by the Fédération Ivoirienne de Basket-Ball.

With two AfroBasket titles and six overall finals appearances, the country is traditionally home to one of the continent's finest basketball national teams. The Elephants have played at the FIBA Basketball World Cup four times and will also play in the 2023 edition.

History
Ivory Coast reached the final of the FIBA Africa Championship for the first time in 1978, but they were defeated by Senegal in the final. They reached the final again in the following tournament, in 1980, but again had to settle for silver, as Senegal took the gold. Another run the following year, in 1981, saw Côte d'Ivoire finally break through and win their first title, as they defeated Egypt for the championship. Four years later, Côte d'Ivoire won their second championship, as they hosted the tournament in 1985, and beat Angola, to win the championship. Côte d'Ivoire finished second at the 2009 FIBA Africa Championship, for their first podium finish since their victory in 1985. They participated in the 2010 FIBA World Championship, which was their first FIBA World Cup appearance since 1986. The team went 1–4 at the tournament, finishing last in Group C. On September 2, 2010, In their final group game, the Ivorians defeated Puerto Rico 88–76, for their first ever FIBA World Cup win, but they came up just short in the tiebreaker to see which team would advance to the knockout stage.

Ivory Coast qualified for the 2019 FIBA World Championship in dramatic and extraordinary circumstances. After only narrowly avoiding elimination in the first qualifying round (they finished 3rd in their group and only qualified because they held the tiebreaker to Mozambique), they needed to win their last three games in the final group by a combined margin of 66 points in order to qualify as the best-ranked third-placed team. They remarkably did so (actually, they won by a combined 73 points), dispatching even African powerhouses and already-qualified Nigeria by a score of 72–46 in the process. Combined with a loss for the Central African Republic against Nigeria, Ivory Coast finished third in the group and qualified for the World Championship by virtue of a better total points difference than Cameroon.

Competitive record

FIBA World Cup

FIBA Africa Championship
 Champions   Runners-up   Third place   Fourth place

African Games

1973 – ?
1978 – 
1987 – 
2003 – 4th
2007 – 6th
2011 – 8th
2015 – 7th

Team

Current roster
Roster for the AfroBasket 2021.

Depth chart

Notable players
Other current notable players from Ivory Coast:

Past rosters
Team for the 2013 FIBA Africa Championship.

Head coaches 
  Vladislav Lučić: (1981–1983)
  Jacques Monclar: (2007)
  Randoald Dessarzin: (2009, 2010)
  Christophe Denis: (2012)
  Natxo Lezkano: (2011, 2013, 2015)
  Dejan Prokic (a.i.): (August 2022)

Kit

Manufacturer
Peak

See also
Ivory Coast national under-19 basketball team
Ivory Coast national under-17 basketball team
Ivory Coast women's national basketball team
Ivory Coast national 3x3 team

References

External links

FIBA profile
Cote d'Ivoire Basketball Records at FIBA Archive

Videos
 🇦🇴 ANG - 🇨🇮 CIV | Basketball Highlights - #FIBAWC 2023 Qualifiers Youtube.com video

 
Men's national basketball teams
1961 establishments in Ivory Coast
Basketball teams established in 1961